Tiina Maarita Rinne (officially Rinne-Reitala; 24 May 1929 – 27 January 2021) was a Finnish actress.

Career 
She worked mainly as a theater actress, especially at the Finnish National Theatre, where she retired in 1994. She is also known for her role as Maija Mäkimaa in the television series Kotikatu.

Films 
 Kultainen kynttilänjalka, 1946
 Ruusu ja kulkuri, 1948
 Kalle-Kustaa Korkin seikkailut, 1949
 Kanavan laidalla, 1949
 Prinsessa Ruusunen, 1949
 Ratavartijan kaunis Inkeri, 1950
 Amor hoi!, 1950
 Isäpappa ja keltanokka, 1950
 Aatamin puvussa... ja vähän Eevankin, 1971
 Pieni pyhiinvaellus, 2000

Television 
 Hanski (Emma), 1966–1967
 Kotikatu (Maija Mäkimaa), 1995–2012
 Ratamo (Aila Nikula), 2018

References

External links 
 
 Tiina Rinteen muistokirjoitus Helsingin Sanomissa

2021 deaths
1929 births
Pro Finlandia Medals of the Order of the Lion of Finland
Finnish actresses
People from Turku
Finnish theatre people
Finnish film actresses
Finnish television actresses